Neoneides muticus is a species of stilt bug in the family Berytidae, found in North America.

References

External links

 

Berytidae